Wagontire Mountain is a summit in the U.S. state of Oregon.

Wagontire Mountain was named for a historical claim that early pioneers reported seeing an old covered wagon tire nearby. 

The unincorporated community of Wagontire was named after the mountain.

References

Mountains of Harney County, Oregon
Mountains of Lake County, Oregon
Mountains of Oregon